Duke of Marlborough or Duchess of Marlborough may refer to a British peerage title or to any of its holders and consorts:

Dukes
 John Churchill, 1st Duke of Marlborough, an outstanding general. Any reference to the Duke of Marlborough is usually referring to him.
Charles Spencer, 3rd Duke of Marlborough (1706–1758)
George Spencer, 4th Duke of Marlborough (1739–1817)
George Spencer-Churchill, 5th Duke of Marlborough (1766–1840)
George Spencer-Churchill, 6th Duke of Marlborough (1793–1857)
John Winston Spencer-Churchill, 7th Duke of Marlborough (1822–1883)
George Charles Spencer-Churchill, 8th Duke of Marlborough (1844–1892)
Charles Richard Spencer-Churchill, 9th Duke of Marlborough (1871–1934)
John Albert William Spencer-Churchill, 10th Duke of Marlborough (1897–1972)
John George Vanderbilt Spencer-Churchill, 11th Duke of Marlborough (1926–2014)
Jamie Spencer-Churchill, 12th Duke of Marlborough (b. November 24, 1955), current holder of title 
George Spencer-Churchill, Earl of Sunderland (b. July 28, 1992), son and heir apparent of 12th Duke

Duchesses
Henrietta Godolphin, 2nd Duchess of Marlborough (1681–1733)
Sarah Churchill, Duchess of Marlborough (1660–1744), wife of the 1st Duke, favourite of Queen Anne
Consuelo Vanderbilt (1877–1964), wife of the 9th Duke, American heiress
Rosita Spencer-Churchill, Duchess of Marlborough (Dagmar Douglas) (b. 1943), the current Duchess
Georgiana Cavendish, Duchess of Devonshire (1757–1806), member of the Marlborough family